The Bohr radius (a0) is a physical constant, approximately equal to the most probable distance between the nucleus and the electron in a hydrogen atom in its ground state. It is named after Niels Bohr, due to its role in the Bohr model of an atom. Its value is

Definition and value

The Bohr radius is defined as

where
 is the permittivity of free space,
 is the reduced Planck constant,
 is the mass of an electron,
 is the elementary charge,
 is the speed of light in vacuum, and
 is the fine-structure constant.

The CODATA value of the Bohr radius (in SI units) is

History
In the Bohr model for atomic structure, put forward by Niels Bohr in 1913, electrons orbit a central nucleus under electrostatic attraction. The original derivation posited that electrons have orbital angular momentum in integer multiples of the reduced Planck constant, which successfully matched the observation of discrete energy levels in emission spectra, along with predicting a fixed radius for each of these levels. In the simplest atom, hydrogen, a single electron orbits the nucleus, and its smallest possible orbit, with the lowest energy, has an orbital radius almost equal to the Bohr radius. (It is not exactly the Bohr radius due to the reduced mass effect. They differ by about 0.05%.)

The Bohr model of the atom was superseded by an electron probability cloud obeying the Schrödinger equation as published in 1926. This is further complicated by spin and quantum vacuum effects to produce fine structure and hyperfine structure. Nevertheless, the Bohr radius formula remains central in atomic physics calculations, due to its simple relationship with fundamental constants (this is why it is defined using the true electron mass rather than the reduced mass, as mentioned above). As such, it became the unit of length in atomic units.

In Schrödinger's quantum-mechanical theory of the hydrogen atom, the Bohr radius is the value of the radial coordinate for which the radial probability density of the electron position is highest.  The expected value of the radial distance of the electron, by contrast, .

Related constants 
The Bohr radius is one of a trio of related units of length, the other two being the reduced Compton wavelength of the electron and the classical electron radius. Any one of these constants can be written in terms of any of the others using the fine-structure constant :

Hydrogen atom and similar systems
The Bohr radius including the effect of reduced mass in the hydrogen atom is given by

where  is the reduced mass of the electron–proton system (with  being the mass of proton). The use of reduced mass is a generalization of the classical two-body problem when we are outside the approximation that the mass of the orbiting body is negligible compared to the mass of the body being orbited. Since the reduced mass of the electron–proton system is a little bit smaller than the electron mass, the "reduced" Bohr radius is slightly larger than the Bohr radius ( meters).

This result can be generalized to other systems, such as positronium (an electron orbiting a positron) and muonium (an electron orbiting an anti-muon) by using the reduced mass of the system and considering the possible change in charge. Typically, Bohr model relations (radius, energy, etc.) can be easily modified for these exotic systems (up to lowest order) by simply replacing the electron mass with the reduced mass for the system (as well as adjusting the charge when appropriate).

These results are summarized in the equation

A table of approximate relationships is given below.

See also
 Bohr magneton
 Rydberg energy

References

External links 
 Length Scales in Physics: the Bohr Radius

Atomic physics
Physical constants
Units of length
Niels Bohr
Atomic radius